The Ministry of Justice and Human Rights of Chile is the Ministry of State responsible for the law and judiciary. The current Minister of Justice and Human Rights is Marcela Ríos, who has served since March 11, 2022.

History
The Ministry of Justice has been known by four different names.
 Ministerio de Justicia, Culto e Instrucción Pública (1837–1887)
 Ministerio de Justicia e Instrucción Pública (1887–1927)
 Ministerio de Justicia (1927–2016)
 Ministerio de Justicia y Derechos Humanos (2016–present)

Ministers of Justice of Chile

See also

 Justice ministry
 Politics of Chile

References

External links
 Ministry of Justice and Human Rights
 minjusticia.gob.cl

Justice ministries

Government ministries of Chile